Aleksej Demjanov (9 December 1973 – 8 August 2021) was a Croatian-Russian gymnast. He competed at the 1996 Summer Olympics.

References

External links
 

1973 births
2021 deaths
Croatian male artistic gymnasts
Olympic gymnasts of Croatia
Gymnasts at the 1996 Summer Olympics
People from Cherkessk
Croatian people of Russian descent